Isaiah Stevens (born November 1, 2000) is an American college basketball player for the Colorado State Rams of the Mountain West Conference (MWC).

High school career
Stevens attended Allen High School in Allen, Texas. As a junior, he led his team to the Class 6A state title. In his senior season, Stevens averaged 21 points and was named District 9-6A co-MVP. He competed for Team Faith on the Amateur Athletic Union circuit alongside five-star recruit Greg Brown. Stevens committed to playing college basketball for Colorado State over offers from SMU and Mississippi State, among others.

College career
On December 22, 2019, Stevens recorded a freshman season-high 26 points, 12 assists and five steals in a 111–104 win over Tulsa in triple overtime. On January 29, 2020, he made a game-winning buzzer beater as part of a 12-point effort in a 92–91 victory over Nevada. As a freshman, Stevens averaged 13.3 points, 4.5 assists and 3.1 rebounds per game, setting the program freshman record for assists. He earned Mountain West Freshman of the Year honors and was selected to the Third Team All-Mountain West by the league's coaches. As a sophomore, Stevens averaged 15.3 points, 5.4 assists and 4.3 assists per game. He was named to the First Team All-Mountain West. Stevens was named to the Second Team All-Mountain West as a junior.

In 2022, Stevens helped lead the Rams to the NCAA tournament for the first time since 2013.

Career statistics

College

|-
| style="text-align:left;"| 2019–20
| style="text-align:left;"| Colorado State
| 32 || 32 || 32.6 || .467 || .380 || .816 || 3.1 || 4.5 || .8 || .1 || 13.3
|-
| style="text-align:left;"| 2020–21
| style="text-align:left;"| Colorado State
| 28 || 28 || 35.2 || .465 || .427 || .865 || 4.3 || 5.4 || 1.1 || .1 || 15.3
|-
| style="text-align:left;"| 2021–22
| style="text-align:left;"| Colorado State
| 31 || 31 || 34.7 || .461 || .377 || .902 || 3.2 || 4.7 || 1.2 || .1 || 14.7
|- class="sortbottom"
| style="text-align:center;" colspan="2"| Career
| 91 || 91 || 34.1 || .464 || .394 || .861 || 3.4 || 4.8 || 1.0 || .1 || 14.3

Personal life
Stevens' older brother, Barrington, played college basketball for South Alabama before embarking on a professional career.

References

External links
Colorado State Rams bio

2000 births
Living people
American men's basketball players
Basketball players from Texas
Colorado State Rams men's basketball players
People from Allen, Texas
Point guards